The Bakr-Tay mine is a large copper mine located in the south-west of Russia in Bashkortostan. Bakr-Tay represents one of the largest copper reserve in Russia and in the world having estimated reserves of 114 million tonnes of ore grading 1.81% copper.

See also 
 List of mines in Russia

References 

Copper mines in Russia